is a Japanese-born actor who is probably best known for his role on the 26-lesson TV program Let's Learn Japanese. On the program, he performed in skits that contained the sentence patterns that each episode focused on and assisted viewers with the day's material with pronunciation drills. He also lent his voice to the pronunciation of hiragana characters.

Apart from Let's Learn Japanese Basic I, he has performed in several stage plays in Japan. He is married and lives with his spouse in Tokyo, Japan.

Characters 
Yusuke has portrayed the following characters on Let's Learn Japanese Basic I:

 Prison Inmate 
 Painter
 Mechanic
 Waiter
 Bar Tender (Lesson 10)
 TV Weatherman
 Police Officer (Koban)
 Doctor
 Veterinarian
 Detective (Lesson 11)
 Jewelry Store Clerk
 Father (Lesson 11)   
 Gymnastics Judge (Lesson 21)
 Hospital Inpatient (Lesson 11)
 Office Worker (Lesson 7)
 Mover

Filmography 

 Hiroshima (1995)

References 

1934 births
Japanese male actors
Living people